Dart Mountain (from Irish: An Dairt, meaning "The Lump")  in County Tyrone is the second highest peak in the Sperrin Mountains in Northern Ireland. The summit is 619 metres (2,031 ft) high. It is the 3511th highest peak in the British Isles and the 246th tallest in Ireland.

References

Mountains and hills of County Londonderry
Marilyns of Northern Ireland
Hewitts of Northern Ireland